Duncan Austin Lawson  is a British mathematician known for work in mathematics education including university-wide mathematics and statistics support.

Early life and education

Lawson attended Bury Grammar School and later obtained a BA and D.Phil. from the University of Oxford.

Career

Lawson worked for British Gas plc before moving to Coventry University in 1987.  His research interests are in efficient computational methods for the calculation of thermal radiative heat transfer.

From 2005-10 Lawson with Tony Croft established the sigma Centre for Excellence in University-wide mathematics and statistics support, which was awarded the 2011 Times Higher Education Award for Outstanding Support for Students. The Centre later developed under the National HE STEM Programme into the sigma Network for Excellence in Mathematics and Statistics Support.

Lawson was awarded National Teaching Fellowship in 2005. Lawson also acted as Assistant Chief Executive of the Higher Education Academy from 2012-13.

Lawson was professor and associate dean of the faculty of science and engineering at Coventry University (2002–13), director of the Maths, Stats & OR Network of the Higher Education Academy (2005-9), and chair of the executive group of the More Maths Grads project (2008–10).

From 2013-18, Lawson was pro-vice-chancellor of formative education at Newman University in Birmingham, before returning to Coventry.

Lawson received the Institute of Mathematics and its Applications' Gold Medal in 2016 jointly with Croft for "an outstanding contribution to the improvement of the teaching of mathematics" by establishing sigma.

Lawson was appointed Member of the Order of the British Empire (MBE) in the 2019 Birthday Honours for services to mathematics in higher education.

Lawson is currently Director of the sigma maths support centre at Coventry University.

Footnotes

External links
 

Year of birth missing (living people)
Living people
Alumni of the University of Oxford
20th-century British mathematicians
21st-century British mathematicians
Academics of Coventry University
Members of the Order of the British Empire